Silver Blaze is a 1937 British, black-and-white crime and mystery film, based loosely on Arthur Conan Doyle's 1892 short story "The Adventure of Silver Blaze". It was directed by Thomas Bentley, and was produced by Twickenham Film Studios Productions. It stars Arthur Wontner as Sherlock Holmes, and Ian Fleming as Dr. Watson. In the United States, the film was released in 1941 by Astor Pictures, where it was also known as Murder at the Baskervilles, retitled by distributors to capitalize on the success of the Basil Rathbone Holmes film, The Hound of the Baskervilles.

It is the last film in the 1931–1937 film series starring Wontner as Sherlock Holmes.

Synopsis
In the 1930s, Sherlock Holmes (Arthur Wontner) takes a holiday by visiting his old friend, Sir Henry Baskerville (Lawrence Grossmith). Holmes' vacation ends when he and Watson suddenly find themselves in the middle of a double-murder mystery; they must find Professor Robert Moriarty (Lyn Harding) and Silver Blaze before the horse race, and bring the criminals to justice.

Cast 
 Arthur Wontner as Sherlock Holmes
 Ian Fleming as Dr. Watson
 Lyn Harding as Professor Moriarty
 John Turnbull as Inspector Lestrade
 Robert Horton as Col. Ross
 Lawrence Grossmith as Sir Henry Baskerville
 Judy Gunn as Diana Baskerville
 Arthur Macrae as Jack Trevor
 Arthur Goullet as Col. Sebastian Moran
 Martin Walker as James Straker
 Eve Gray as Mrs. Mary Straker
 Gilbert Davis as Miles Stanford
 Minnie Rayner as Mrs. Hudson
 D. J. Williams as Silas Brown
 Ralph Truman as Bert Prince
 Ronald Shiner as Simpson the Stable Boy / Jockey (uncredited)

Critical reception
In a retrospective review, TV Guide wrote that the film "suffers from too slight a plot stretched out to feature length. Wontner is good in his final portrayal of the great detective, and the film does have some interesting moments; but on the whole this is lackluster Holmes, an all too elementary case."

References

External links 
 
 
 
 
 Silver Blaze as Murder at the Baskervilles available for free download at Internet Archive

1937 films
1937 crime films
1937 mystery films
British black-and-white films
1930s English-language films
Films directed by Thomas Bentley
British crime films
British mystery films
1930s British films